WVRQ-FM (102.3 FM) is a radio station broadcasting a country music format.  Licensed to Viroqua, Wisconsin, United States, the station serves the La Crosse area.  The station is currently owned by Robinson Corporation and features programming from ABC Radio. The former call letters were WGBM.

References

External links
WVRQ 102 FM Facebook

VRQ-FM
Country radio stations in the United States
Radio stations established in 1983